Mary Ellen Simpson is an American violinist, mostly noted for her work with Yanni, Gary Ruley and Mule Train and Walker's Run. She is a founding member of The Whiskey Rebellion band.

Biography 
Simpson's father, a documented descendant of Pocahontas, plays banjo and her Taiwanese mother is a classically trained pianist. She is the sister of noted violinist Ann Marie Calhoun and her brothers play guitar.

She began learning to play violin at the age of five. She says she grew up listening to her sister play. Like her sister she played bluegrass music in her family band.  According to Simpson, "her classical background gives her a wider variety of tones and better control of her sound than she would have had she only studied bluegrass."

Mary attended Lake Braddock Secondary School in Burke, Virginia. She has a double major in music and economics from the University of Virginia.

The Whiskey Rebellion 

Mary Simpson, Roy Myers, Ryan Phillips, and David Cosper connected the summer of 2005 at the Maury River Fiddler's Convention in Buena Vista, Virginia. Myers and Phillips had been performing around Richmond while Simpson and Cosper appeared in Charlottesville while studying music at the University of Virginia.  The Richmond faction invited the Charlottesvillians east for some gigs and the band was formed.  As to how an historic event – the "unhappy reaction of whiskey makers to a tax imposed by the federal government during George Washington's presidency" – ended up being their band name, Phillips explains:

Tim Deibler, bass player − a resident of Charlottesville, Virginia, who studied music at Christopher Newport University − is the newest member of the group.

The Whiskey Rebellion went into the recording studio this  and recorded several new songs which will be included on an upcoming EP.

Performance 
The Whiskey Rebellion has appeared at numerous notable music festivals such as the 25th anniversary of "The Goonies" Festival in Astoria, Oregon; Maury River Fiddler's Convention in Buena Vista, Virginia; and Watermelon Park Festival in Berryville, Virginia. They have shared the bill with such acts as The Sam Bush Band, Peter Rowan and Tony Rice, Tim O'Brien, The Seldom Scene, the Carolina Chocolate Drops, Larry Keel, and many more.

Simpson performed with Yanni on his 2011 North American Spring Tour. They played such venues as Radio City Music Hall in New York City, The Warfield Theatre in San Francisco, and the Fox Theatre in Atlanta.

She was part of Yanni's orchestra in the 2014 World Tour
and part of his 2016 North American Tour.

Musical style 
The Whiskey Rebellion "plays a mostly high-energy, joyful brand of bluegrass, with skillful picking and two and three-part harmonies" according to The Virginia Pilot.  But, while a "casual listen" to their debut album might tempt one to "plug the band into the category reserved for pure bluegrass," warns the Richmond Times-Dispatch, "... there's much more to The Whiskey Rebellion than twang and high lonesome." Says founder Simpson: "We play a lot of bluegrass standards, and we also take a lot of popular songs and cover them, bluegrass style."

Personnel 
Musicians performing together in The Whiskey Rebellion include:
Mary Simpson – violin / vocals
Jared Pool – mandolin / vocals
Roy Myers  – banjo
Tim Deibler – bass
Ryan Phillips – guitar

Distinctions, honors, and awards 
The Whiskey Rebellion music video, The Ballad of Chester Copperpot, took the 2010 Gold Level Oregon Film Awards: Oregon Film Competition at the Oregon Film Festival.
The Whiskey Rebellion mandolinist Jared Pool performed a show with John Starling, founding member of The Seldom Scene, in Starling's hometown of Fredericksburg, Virginia.
Ryan Phillips placed first in the 2010 Watermelon Park Festival guitar contest. The prize was a custom Left Handed Fairbuilt Barnburner guitar (base value of $2,400).  He placed third in the same contest in 2007.
The Whiskey Rebellion was invited to play the 25th anniversary of "The Goonies" Festival that took place June 4–7, 2010 in Astoria, Oregon.
Jared Pool placed first in the 2007 Watermelon Park Festival guitar contest, winning a Fairbuilt Barnburner guitar (base value of $2,400).
The Pat Ruley Trophy for Best All Around Blue Grass Performer, named for Gary Ruley's father and presented annually at the Maury River Fiddler's Convention held in Buena Vista, Virginia, was won by Mary Simpson in 2005.

Discography 
The Whiskey Rebellion (2007) Crop Circle Records
Lay It Down (2009) CD Baby

References

External links 

Mary Simpson Facebook page.
The Whiskey Rebellion official website.

American fiddlers
Women classical violinists
Year of birth missing (living people)
Living people
American bluegrass musicians
Native American musicians
American people of Chinese descent
Musical groups established in 2005
Musicians from Charlottesville, Virginia
21st-century American violinists
21st-century American women musicians